Lamspringe is a village and a municipality in the district of Hildesheim, in Lower Saxony, Germany. It is situated approximately 20 km south of Hildesheim. Since 1 November 2016, the former municipalities Harbarnsen, Neuhof, Sehlem and Woltershausen are part of the municipality Lamspringe.

It was known historically as the seat of the former Lamspringe Abbey, of which the church and other buildings remain.

Lamspringe was the seat of the former Samtgemeinde ("collective municipality") Lamspringe.

Sons and daughters of the place 
 Kurt Hotmeyer (1905-1967), SS doctor
 Richard Mühe (1929-2009), watchmaker and physicist
 Lothar Hampe (born 1946), politician (CDU)

References

External links 

Hildesheim (district)